2S7 can refer to:

2S7 Pion, a Soviet/Russian self-propelled gun
2S7, the FAA location identifier for Chiloquin State Airport